The Lithuanian Christian Democrats (LKD) was a Christian-democratic political party in Lithuania. The party was a member of the European People's Party (EPP) and the European Christian Political Movement.

History
The LKD was established in 2001 by a merger of the Christian Democratic Union and the Lithuanian Christian Democratic Party, who between them held three seats in the Seimas. A faction opposed to the merger formed a new party, the Lithuanian Party of Christian Democracy (Lietuvos krikščioniškosios demokratijos partija), chaired by Zigmas Zinkevičius.

The 2004 elections saw the new party receive just 1.4% of the vote, and lose its parliamentary representation. On 17 May 2008, the LKD merged with the Homeland Union, which was renamed to Homeland Union - Lithuanian Christian Democrats as a result.

References

External links
Official website

Catholic political parties
Christian democratic parties in Europe
Defunct political parties in Lithuania
Political parties established in 2001
Political parties disestablished in 2008